= Maurice Dietrich =

Polish pianist and composer

Maurice (or Moritz, or Maurycy) Dietrich (1816–1887) was pianist and composer in Congress Poland who had moved there from the Kingdom of Saxony.

Dietrich was born in Saxony. He moved to Polish Łomża and then to Warsaw, where he died.

His compositions are for piano, mainly dances and salon pieces, but include also some opera transcriptions. They were published by Franz Spiess's firm (later passed to Rudolph Friedlein) in Warsaw from the first half of the 1840s on. Later works (from ca.1869) were printed by the André publishing house in Offenbach am Main.
